The Kingdom of Etruria was an Italian kingdom between 1801 and 1807 that made up a large part of modern Tuscany.  It took its name from Etruria, the old Roman name for the land of the Etruscans.

History

The kingdom was created by the Treaty of Aranjuez, signed at Aranjuez, Spain on 21 March 1801. In the context of a larger agreement between Napoleonic France and Spain, the Bourbons of Parma were compensated for the loss of their territory in northern Italy (which had been occupied by French troops since 1796). The King of Spain decided that his cousin Ferdinand, Duke of Parma had to cede his duchy to France, and in return his son Louis I was granted the Kingdom of Etruria (which was created from the Grand Duchy of Tuscany). Shortly after Ferdinand refused to leave, he suddenly died in suspect circumstances. To make way for the Bourbons, the Habsburg Grand Duke of Tuscany Ferdinand III was ousted and compensated with the Electorate of Salzburg by the Treaty of Luneville. Originally the Grand Duchy of Tuscany, Etruria had been ceded to the Bourbons in 1801 in the person of Charles IV's eldest daughter and her Italian consort.

Outside the Treaty of Aranjuez, Spain also secretly agreed to retrocede the Louisiana territory (over 2 million square kilometers) back to France in order to secure the Kingdom of Etruria as a client state for Spain; Louisiana was first ceded by France to Spain in 1763 at the end of the Seven Years' War.  Louisiana was duly transferred to France on 15 October 1802, after the signing of the Treaty of Aranjuez.  Napoleon subsequently sold Louisiana to the United States in the Louisiana Purchase on April 30, 1803, in order to pay for his French armies during the War of the Third Coalition.

The first king (Louis I) died young in 1803, and his underage son Charles Louis succeeded him. His mother, Maria Luisa of Spain, was appointed regent. However, since Etruria was troubled with smuggling and espionage, Napoleon annexed the territory, thus becoming the last non-Bonaparte Italian kingdom on the Peninsula. Since Spain's only hope of compensation lay in Portugal, co-operation with the emperor became more important.

In 1807, Napoleon dissolved the kingdom and integrated it into France, turning it into three French départements: Arno, Méditerranée and Ombrone. The king and his mother were promised the throne of a new Kingdom of Northern Lusitania (in northern Portugal), but this plan was never realized due to the break between Napoleon and the Spanish Bourbons in 1808. After his downfall in 1814, Tuscany was restored to its Habsburg grand dukes. In 1815, the Duchy of Lucca was carved out of Tuscany, on the lands of the former Republic of Lucca, as compensation for the Bourbons of Parma until they resumed their rule in 1847. As stipulated in the Treaty of Paris of 1817, in execution of the art. 99 of the Final Act of the Congress of Vienna, the Duchy of Lucca was then annexed by the Grand Duchy of Tuscany.

Flags and coats of arms

References

 
Former kingdoms
History of Florence
History of Tuscany
1800s in Italy
1800s in the Grand Duchy of Tuscany
States and territories established in 1801
States and territories disestablished in 1807
1801 establishments in Italy
1807 disestablishments in Italy
1801 establishments in Europe
1807 disestablishments in Europe
19th century in the Grand Duchy of Tuscany
Former monarchies of Europe